The 2012–13 season will be the 52nd season of competitive association football in Algeria.

Promotion and relegation

Pre-season

National teams

Algeria national football team

2013 Africa Cup of Nations qualification

2013 Africa Cup of Nations

All times South African Standard Time (UTC+2)

2014 FIFA World Cup qualification

International Friendlies

Algerian women's national football team

League season

Ligue Professionnelle 1

Ligue Professionnelle 2

Ligue Nationale du Football Amateur

Groupe Est

Groupe Centre

Groupe Ouest

Inter-Régions Division

Groupe Ouest

Groupe Centre Est

Groupe Centre Ouest

Groupe Est

Ligue Régional I

Ligue Régionale Ouargla

Women's football

Diary of the season

Deaths

Retirements

Notes

References